WEEB (990 AM) is a radio station licensed to Southern Pines, North Carolina, United States, broadcasting a news/talk format. The station is currently owned by Pinehurst Broadcasting Corporation.

History
WEEB as it exists today was formed from the 1950 merger of two stations which started in the same year in the same town. The first station, WSTS, signed on at 990 kHz with 250 watts during the day, increased to 1,000 watts in December 1948. It was approved for operation by the Sandhills Broadcasting Corporation on March 27, 1947, going on the air on August 8. Just three months later, a second station went on the air in the same town. WEEB operated with 1,000 watts on 1360 kHz and programming from the Mutual Broadcasting System and was owned by Sandhills Community Broadcasters. WSTS sued WEEB before it launched for slander, claiming that WEEB officials made false statements to advertisers to dissuade them from purchasing air time on WSTS. However, after a management change at WSTS, the new operators opted not to pursue the lawsuit.

On December 1, 1950, the two stations consolidated with WEEB's programming and Mutual hookup on WSTS's studio and transmitter facilities, stripping Southern Pines (population 3,500) of its reported distinction as the smallest U.S. town with two radio stations; the owners of WSTS then purchased WWGP at nearby Sanford. WEEB increased power to 5,000 watts in 1959.

The station briefly held the call sign WCEL from 1982 to 1985 after the Southern Dandy Corporation purchased it from Sandhills, which was led by Jack S. Younts.

In 1990, after WSTS in Laurinburg changed from gospel music to Top 40, WEEB changed from "older and milder rock music" to gospel. Jerry Stout, the former WSTS program director and morning host, moved to those same positions at WEEB. The next year, Stephen Adams purchased the station from Richardson Broadcasting Group and converted it to a news/talk format.

In 2016, WEEB added the first of two FM translators, W247CE (97.3 FM), to bring its signal to the FM band.

References

External links
 
 

EEB
Radio stations established in 1947
1947 establishments in North Carolina